Jacobo Salvador Kouffati Agostini (born 30 June 1993) is a Venezuelan association football player who plays as a midfielder. He currently plays for Orense.

Career

International career
He has been summoned several times to the work modules of the Venezuela national under-20 football team, and summoned to the list of "Good Faith" of the Venezuela National Team for the Copa América Centenario where he was discarded in the last Cut of the National Team (Rafael Dudamel).

However, he made a preparation tour with his team for that competition, which had an opportunity to play against the Galicia national football team on May 20, 2016 and against Panama on May 24, 2016.

International goals
Scores and results list Venezuela's goal tally first.

References

External links
 

1993 births
Living people
People from Maturín
Venezuelan footballers
Venezuelan expatriate footballers
Venezuela international footballers
Association football midfielders
Monagas S.C. players
Trujillanos FC players
Deportivo Italia players
Asociación Civil Deportivo Lara players
C.D. Cuenca footballers
Millonarios F.C. players
Deportes Iquique footballers
Xinjiang Tianshan Leopard F.C. players
Deportivo Táchira F.C. players
Orense S.C. players
Venezuelan Primera División players
Ecuadorian Serie A players
China League One players
Chilean Primera División players
Categoría Primera A players
Syrian Christians
Venezuelan people of Syrian descent
Expatriate footballers in Ecuador
Expatriate footballers in China
Expatriate footballers in Chile
Expatriate footballers in Colombia
Venezuelan expatriate sportspeople in Ecuador
Venezuelan expatriate sportspeople in China
Venezuelan expatriate sportspeople in Chile
Venezuelan expatriate sportspeople in Colombia
21st-century Venezuelan people